Časoris is a Slovenian online newspaper for children. It provides timely, relevant news articles for children, teachers in the classroom and parents at home. Časoris received international acclaim in 2019, when it was nominated for the first European Media Literacy Award. In the same year, its Stories of Children from around the World received the Intercultural Achievement Award in the Media Category. The project also won the Clarinet Project Award in the Web and Social Media category.

Content 
It is read by children aged  6 to 12 year old.

It aims to present news about current events from Slovenia and abroad in a child-friendly format, alongside news on entertainment, science and sport. Every article is written in a kids-friendly language and it is accompanied by questions for additional reflection and a glossary.

In a special section there is also information for parents and teachers.

Authors 
Časoris is written and edited by Sonja Merljak Zdovc, however, a team of children and adults helps with ideas and contributions.

It was founded in April 2015 – in the aftermath of the January’s terrorist attack in Paris. At the time when many parents were wondering how to explain what happened to their children, an article by Wan Ifra  about how a French newspaper for children did just that sparked the idea to create a newspaper for children also in Slovenia.

The team behind Časoris strongly believes that children can and want to understand the news if it is put in context for them and presented in kids-friendly language.

With Časoris they are trying to help them to understand the news, to critically think about what they’re reading, and to apply their knowledge to the real world.

Awards 
 Shortlisted for the first European Media Literacy Award.
 Intercultural Achievement Award in the Media Category.
 Clarinet Project Award in the Web and Social Media Category.

References 
 An article about Časoris in the national newspaper Delo.
 A review of Časoris by National Education Institute.
 An article about Časoris in Siol.
 An article about Časoris in Total Slovenia News.

External links 
 Časoris

Newspapers published in Slovenia
Slovene-language newspapers